Qatar first competed at the Asian Games in 1978.

Medal tables

Medals by Asian Games 

*Red border color indicates tournament was held on home soil.

References